Emiliana Escalada (1884-1962) was a Paraguayan pharmacist, teacher, feminist and trade union leader.

Life
Emiliana Escalada was born in Coronel Oviedo in 1884. She represented Paraguay in the first International Congress of Teachers, held in Montevideo. She died March 29, 1962.

References

1884 births
1962 deaths
Paraguayan feminists
Paraguayan pharmacists
Paraguayan schoolteachers
Paraguayan trade unionists
Paraguayan women educators
Women pharmacists